Mezoneuron brachycarpum, the corky prickle vine is a species of climbing plant found in eastern Australia. A large woody vine with bipinnate foliage.

References 

Caesalpinieae
Flora of New South Wales
Flora of Queensland